Çiçekköy can refer to:

 Çiçekköy, Samsat
 Çiçekköy, Yapraklı